Puget Sound Plaza is a 21-story skyscraper in the Metropolitan Tract of  downtown Seattle, Washington. It is located on 1325 Fourth Avenue and offers 271,000 rentable square feet of space. Its lower two stories were remodeled in 1988. The building also houses a parking garage with 334 parking stalls.

External links

Building facts at owner's web site

References
Emporis.com page

Skyscraper office buildings in Seattle
NBBJ buildings
Office buildings completed in 1960